"A Walk in the Sun" is a hard science fiction short story published in 1991 by American writer Geoffrey A. Landis.  It won the 1992 Hugo Award for Best Short Story, the 1992 Asimov's Reader Poll Award and was nominated for the 1992 Locus Award.

Plot summary
The story follows Trish, the sole survivor of a terrible crash landing on the Moon. After regaining her senses, she contacts Earth and learns that it will be thirty days before a rescue mission can reach her. In the meantime, she depends on a wing-like solar panel to provide power to her suit's recycling facilities, and lunar night is approaching. 

To stay alive, Trish has to keep walking continually to stay in the sunlight. Due to exhaustion and loneliness, she starts hallucinating that her elder sister Karen is with her, whose death some years earlier Trish has not yet fully coped with.

References

External links 
 

Science fiction short stories
1991 short stories
Hugo Award for Best Short Story winning works
Short stories set on the Moon
Works originally published in Asimov's Science Fiction
Hard science fiction
Works by Geoffrey A. Landis